In enzymology, a beta-adrenergic-receptor kinase is an enzyme that catalyzes the chemical reaction:

ATP + [beta-adrenergic receptor]  ADP + phospho-[beta-adrenergic receptor]

Thus, the two substrates of this enzyme are ATP and beta-adrenergic receptor, whereas its two products are ADP and phospho-beta-adrenergic receptor.

This enzyme belongs to the family of transferases, specifically those transferring a phosphate group to the sidechain oxygen atom of serine or threonine residues in proteins (protein-serine/threonine kinases).  The systematic name of this enzyme class is ATP:[beta-adrenergic receptor] phosphotransferase. Other names in common use include ATP:beta-adrenergic-receptor phosphotransferase, [beta-adrenergic-receptor] kinase, beta-adrenergic receptor-specific kinase, beta-AR kinase, beta-ARK, beta-ARK 1, beta-ARK 2, beta-receptor kinase, GRK2, GRK3, beta-adrenergic-receptor kinase (phosphorylating), beta2ARK, betaARK1, beta-adrenoceptor kinase, beta-adrenoceptor kinase 1, beta-adrenoceptor kinase 2, ADRBK1, BARK1, adrenergic receptor kinase, and STK15.  Several compounds are known to inhibit this enzyme, including Zinc, and Digitonin.

References

External links

EC 2.7.11
Enzymes of unknown structure